Edmond Louis Joseph Arthur Roche (20 February 1828 in Calais – 24 December 1861 in Paris) was a 19th-century French poet, playwright, librettist and violinist.

A student of Habeneck at the Paris conservatory where he learned to play the violin (1842), he became first violinist of the orchestra of the Théâtre de la Porte-Saint-Martin before leaving this position to become a customs employee.

Works 
A friend of Richard Wagner, he gave the first translation in French of Tannhäuser.

His poésies were published in 1863 by Michel Lévy posthumously at the expense of his friends, with a preface by Victorien Sardou with engravings by Camille Corot and others.

1853: Mozart, étude poétique
1856: Les Algues, études marines
1859: Stradivarius
1859: Les Récréations enfantines
1860: L'Italie de nos jours
1861: Les Virtuoses contemporains
1863: La dernière fourberie de Scapin (À propos in one act in verse), (posthumous)

Bibliography 
 Madeleine Guignebert, neÌe Duplessy, Henri Weitzmann, Le douanier de Wagner, Edmond Roche, 1861
 Arthur Pougin, Supplément et complément, vol.2, 1881, (p. 427)
 Revue internationale de musique française, Vol.1, Slatkine, 1980,

References

External links 
 Edmond Roche on BNF
 Travaux sur Edmond Roche

19th-century French poets
19th-century French dramatists and playwrights
French opera librettists
19th-century French male classical violinists
1828 births
People from Calais
1861 deaths